Admiral Sir Archibald Dickson, 1st Baronet (c.1739–1803) was a Royal Navy officer.

Naval career

He was born around 1739 the son of Archibald Dickson. He initially entered the merchant navy in 1752. He moved to the Royal Navy in 1755 and passed the lieutenants exam in 1759.

In 1765 he was given command of HMS Egmont and in 1771 took command of HMS Thunder.

Promoted to captain on 31 January 1774, Dickson was given command of the fourth-rate HMS Antelope in January 1774 and the sixth-rate HMS Greyhound in October 1775. In Greyhound, he took part in the action against the Penobscot Expedition in July 1779 and fought at the Battle of Martinique in April 1780 during the American Revolutionary War. He was next given command of the third-rate HMS Dublin and saw action at the Battle of Cape Spartel in October 1782. After that he was given command of the third-rate HMS Goliath in 1786, of the third-rate HMS Captain in 1790 and the third-rate HMS Egmont in 1793.

Promoted to rear-admiral on 12 April 1794 and to vice-admiral on 1 June 1795, Dickson became Commander-in-Chief, North Sea in 1800. In August 1800 a diplomatic mission was sent to Copenhagen under Lord Whitworth, accompanied by a fleet under Dickson's command. She was paid off in April 1802.

Baronetcy and death
In honour of his service, Dickson was created Sir Archibald Dickson, 1st Baronet on 21 September 1802. 

He died near Norwich and died in May 1803.

Family

Dickson had married twice: firstly to Elizabeth Porter who died in 1779, and (after a 20 year wait) in 1800 he married Frances Anne Willis.

He had a daughter, Elizabeth Dickson (d.1856), but no male heir. Therefore, the baronetcy passed to his nephew, Archibald Collingwood Dickson.

References

Sources
 

|-

Royal Navy admirals
1803 deaths
Baronets in the Baronetage of the United Kingdom
Royal Navy personnel of the Seven Years' War
Royal Navy personnel of the American Revolutionary War
Royal Navy personnel of the French Revolutionary Wars
Royal Navy personnel of the Napoleonic Wars